Aberdeen F.C. competed in the Scottish Premier Division, Scottish League Cup, Scottish Cup and UEFA Cup in season 1988–89.

Overview

Aberdeen began the season under new management. Alex Smith and Jocky Scott were appointed as co-managers after the resignation of Ian Porterfield during the summer. New signings included Paul Mason and Theo Snelders from FC Groningen and FC Twente respectively.

Aberdeen finished second in the League behind Rangers, and reached the final of the League Cup, which they lost to Rangers after extra time. In the Scottish Cup, they lost in the fourth round to Dundee United, and in Europe, they lost to East German club Dynamo Dresden in the first round of the UEFA Cup.

Results

Scottish Premier Division

Final standings

Scottish League Cup

Scottish Cup

UEFA Cup

Squad

Appearances & Goals

|}

References

 

Aberdeen F.C. seasons
Aberdeen